Riga International Coach Terminal is a bus station in Riga, Latvia, for both domestic and international bus lines. The terminal is situated at the address 1 Prāgas iela, right next to the Riga Central Railway Station. The terminal was built in 1964 and has 33 bays.

List of bus routes

International

National

Short distance

Long distance

References

External links 
Riga International Coach Terminal website
Riga International Coach Terminal on the map

Buildings and structures completed in 1964
Bus stations in Latvia
Buildings and structures in Riga
1964 establishments in the Soviet Union
1964 establishments in Latvia